Katharine Brown (born 7 April 1987) is a Scottish model and beauty pageant titleholder who was crowned Miss Scotland 2009 and Miss United Kingdom 2010. Katharine attended Dunblane High School.

Miss World 2009
Brown represented Scotland at the Miss World 2009 pageant which was held in Johannesburg on 12 December 2009. She placed 2nd runner-up at the Beach Beauty fast track event and was one of the top 12 finalists at Miss World Top Model.

Miss International 2010
As the highest-ranked British delegate at Miss World, Brown was named Miss United Kingdom, gaining the right to represent the UK at the Miss International 2010 pageant in China, where she was one of 70 delegates competing for the title.

References

1987 births
Living people
Miss World 2009 delegates
People from Dunblane
Scottish beauty pageant winners
Miss International 2010 delegates
Miss United Kingdom winners